Menachem Mendel Morgensztern of Kotzk, better known as the Kotzker Rebbe and the Kotzker (1787–1859) was a Hasidic rabbi and leader.

Life
Born to a non-Hasidic family in Goraj near Lublin, Poland, he became attracted to Hasidic philosophy in his youth. He was known for having acquired impressive Talmudic and Kabbalistic knowledge at an early age. He was a student of Reb Bunim of Peshischa, and upon the latter's death attracted many of his followers. Morgensztern was well known for his incisive and down-to-earth philosophies, and sharp-witted sayings. He appears to have had little patience for false piety or stupidity.

From 1839 he lived in seclusion for the last twenty years of his life.

Students and legacy 
The Kotzker Rebbe never published any works. He wrote many manuscripts, but he had them all burned before his death. Several collections of his sayings have been published, most notably Emes VeEmunah (Truth and Faith).

The Kotzker Rebbe's disciple Rabbi Avrohom Bornsztain, author of Avnei Nezer and first Sochatchover Rebbe, was his son-in-law (having married Sara Tzina Morgenstern, the daughter of the Kotzker Rebbe).

The Kotzker Rebbe is considered to be the spiritual founder upon which the Ger dynasty in Poland is based, through the teachings of its founder and first Rebbe Rabbi Yitzchak Meir Alter, known for his work as the Chidushei Harim, who was a preeminent disciple of the Kotzker Rebbe and his brother in law through his second wife.

One of his major students was Rabbi Mordechai Yosef Leiner of Izbica.

Dynasty 

 His eldest son, Rabbi Dovid Morgensztern, succeeded him as Kotzker Rebbe (1809–1893).
 The third Kotzker Rebbe was Rabbi Chaim Yisrael Morgenstern (the Pilover Rebbe, 1840–1905).
 The fourth Kotzker Rebbe was Rabbi Yitzchak Zelig Morgenstern (the Sokolover Rebbe, 1866–1939).
 The fifth Kotzker Rebbe was Rabbi Jacob Mendel Morgenstern (the Węgrów Rebbe, 1887–1939).
 The sixth Kotzker Rebbe was Rabbi David Solomon Morgenstern, who emigrated to London, England and then, Chicago, Illinois where he served the Chicago community.

Some of the Kotzker's sayings
"What kind of G-d would He be if I could understand Him?"
"If I am I because I am I, and you are you because you are you, then I am I and you are you. But if I am I because you are you and you are you because I am I, then I am not I and you are not you!"
"Do not be satisfied with the speech of your lips and the thought in your heart, all the promises and good sayings in your mouth, and all the good thoughts in your heart; rather you must arise and do!"
"A person must renew himself, and his world with him, each and every day. But one who does not do so, and rather performs his deeds as a mechanical function, does nothing other than the actions of a monkey. Just as this monkey has no personality of his own, but rather copies his own actions and his fellow, so too this person."
"Not all that is thought need be said, not all that is said need be written, not all that is written need be published, and not all that is published need be read."
Man must "guard himself and his uniqueness, and not imitate his fellow ... for initially man was created 'in his own image', and only afterwards in the image of God."
"People are accustomed to look at the heavens and to wonder what happens there. It would be better if they would look within themselves, to see what happens there."
"Where is God to be found? In the place where He is given entry."
"You don't love fish. If you loved the fish, you would not have killed it and cooked it on a fire."
"Just as it is the way of an ape to imitate humans, so too, a person, when he has become old, imitates himself, and does what was his manner previously." In other words, most of us, at some point in life, either consciously or not, become satisfied with who we are and what we've become. As such, we cease to strive toward attaining greater spiritual heights. We are content to live out our remaining days as a mere imitation of ourselves!

"Each person was created in his/her image and only then in God's image."

There are many more wise and important sayings by the Kotzker Rebbe.

See also 
Kotsk

References

Sources
 Fox, Dr. Joseph (1988). Rabbi Menachem Mendel of Kotzk: A Biographical Study of the Chasidic Master. New York:Bash Publications Inc.
 Oratz, Rabbi Ephraim (1989) And Nothing But The Truth according to the Rebbe of Kotzk. Judaica Press.
 Heschel, Abraham Joshua (1973). A Passion for Truth. New York:Farrar, Straus and Giroux.
 Raz, Simcha, Levin, Edward (trans.) (1995). The sayings of Menachem Mendel of Kotsk. Northvale, N.J.:Jason Aronson Inc.

External links

 Fox, Joseph Dr., "Rabbi Menachem Mendel of Kotzk" A Biographical Study of the Chasidic Master, .pdf book download
 The Hammer of Solitude: Boundaries and Alienation in the Life of Rabbi Menachem Mendel Morgenstern of Kotsk

1787 births
1859 deaths
Hasidic rebbes
Hasidic rabbis in Europe
Polish Hasidic rabbis
Burials in Poland
People from Biłgoraj